The Journal of Trauma and Acute Care Surgery is a monthly peer-reviewed medical journal covering the study of traumatic injuries. It was established in 1961 as the Journal of Trauma by Williams & Wilkins, obtaining its current name in 2012. The journal is currently published by Lippincott Williams & Wilkins and is the official journal of the American Association for the Surgery of Trauma, the Eastern Association for the Surgery of Trauma, the Trauma Association of Canada, and the Western Trauma Association. The editor-in-chief is Ernest E. Moore (Denver Health Medical Center).

Abstracting and indexing
According to the Journal Citation Reports, the journal has a 2016 impact factor of 3.403, ranking it 11th out of 33 journals in the category "Critical Care Medicine".

See also

 List of medical journals

References

External links
 

Emergency medicine journals
English-language journals
Lippincott Williams & Wilkins academic journals
Monthly journals
Publications established in 1961
Surgery journals
Trauma surgery